Hull Football Club, commonly referred to as Hull or Hull F.C., is a professional rugby league football club established in 1865 and based in West Hull, East Riding of Yorkshire, England. The club plays in the Super League competition and were known as Hull Sharks from 1996–99.

Hull F.C. were one of the founding members of the Northern Rugby Football Union which was formed in 1895 in Huddersfield, making them one of the world's first twenty-two rugby league clubs. Later that year they moved to the Hull Athletic Club's ground at the Boulevard, Airlie Street, which gave rise to their nickname the "Airlie Birds" (Early Birds). Traditionally people from the west side of Hull support Hull F.C. while Hull Kingston Rovers are supported by the east half, the border being the River Hull.

Old Faithful is a traditional Hull F.C. terrace song. The team shares the MKM Stadium with association football side Hull City. Their mascot is the "Airlie Bird".

History

Early years 
The club was formed in 1865 by a group of ex-schoolboys from York, most notably Anthony Bradley, who had been at Rugby School. The founders used to meet at the Young Men's Fellowship, at St Mary's Church, Lowgate. The vicar at that time was the Reverend Scott and his five sons made up the nucleus of the team. The club immediately took on members who were plumbers and glaziers. Soon another team, Hull White Star, was formed and the two clubs merged. Hull Football Club was one of the first clubs in the north of England to join the Rugby Football Union.

Hull F.C., then nicknamed the All Blacks, were one of the initial 22 clubs to form the Northern Union after the acrimonious split from the Rugby Football Union in 1895. The club moved from East Hull to the Hull Athletic Club at the Boulevard in 1895, and subsequently played their first ever match there in September of that year. 8,000 people turned out to witness the first club's match in which Hull F.C. beat Liversedge RFC.
The Oxford-educated Cyril Lemprière (1870–1939), who also played for Yorkshire, was captain of Hull during the 1895–96 and 1897–98 season.

The early years of the Northern Union saw Hull F.C. prosper, and their black and white irregular hooped jerseys, which they adopted in 1909, became one of the most famous and feared strips in the league. Between 1908–10, Hull F.C. lost three consecutive Challenge Cup Finals. In the first; they failed to score against Hunslet who would go on to win All Four Cups whilst in the second they failed to score against Wakefield Trinity. In the third final of 1910, they held Leeds to a 7–7 draw at Fartown, Huddersfield but were heavily beaten in the replay held two days later.

In 1913, they paid a world record £600, plus £14 per match, to Hunslet for Billy Batten, one of only seventeen players, and the only representative from Hull F.C., so far inducted into the British Rugby League Hall of Fame. A year later the Airlie Birds won their first Challenge Cup, beating Huddersfield in the semi-final and Wakefield Trinity in the final held in Halifax. Playing alongside Billy on that day was John "Jack" Harrison VC, MC who scored a try. Harrison scored 52 tries in the 1914–5 season, a club record that still stands. Twelve Hull F.C. players were killed during the First World War.

Australian Jim Devereux became the first player to score 100 tries for Hull.

In 1920, Batten was once again key in Hull F.C.'s first ever Championship Final, scoring the only try in the 3–2 victory over Huddersfield.

The early-1920s were bittersweet years for the club. In 1921, Hull F.C. lost the Yorkshire County Cup but won the county championship, both against rivals Hull Kingston Rovers. Hull F.C. could not match the successes of 1914, losing a further two consecutive cup finals in 1922 and 23 to Rochdale Hornets and Leeds respectively, but they managed to win the Yorkshire County Cup in 1923 and finish top of the league.

In the early 1930s, Hull F.C. had a full back and goal kicker called Joe Oliver. Oliver was so dependable with the boot that the crowd at one match spontaneously started singing the Gene Autry song, Old Faithful, at him. Hull F.C. supporters adopted the song as their battle cry from then on.

Hull F.C.'s record attendance was set in 1936 when 28,798 turned up for the visit of Leeds for a third round Challenge cup match.

Post-Second World War 
The 1952 Kangaroos visited the Boulevard on Monday 8 September. They had opened their tour with a victory at Keighley two days earlier, and they continued their winning run with a 28–0 victory over Hull F.C..

In 1955, the black Welshman Roy Francis became the first black professional coach in any British team sport, when he switched from playing on the wing to coaching Hull F.C..

Hull F.C. team won the league championship in 1956 when Colin Hutton kicked a last-minute penalty in the final against Halifax at Maine Road, Manchester. Hull F.C. won the play-offs again in 1958, against Workington Town. They also won the European Club championship in 1957 and lost in the cup finals at Wembley in 1959 and 1960. These triumphs healed the wound of two successive Yorkshire County Cup Final defeats in 1955 and 1957. They lost in two further Challenge Cup finals to Wigan and Wakefield Trinity in 1959 and 1960. All these reverses, when one hand had been grasping so many trophies, gave Hull F.C. a steely resolve and a thirst for success.

Johnny Whiteley became player coach in October 1963. When Roy Francis retired as Hull F.C. coach in 1965, Whiteley took over as coach. Hull F.C. lost to Wakefield Trinity 17–10 victory in the 1968 Rugby Football League Championship final at Headingley on 4 May 1968. Whiteley resigned in 1970 to coach Hull Kingston Rovers. Ivor Watts was then appointed coach from 1970–1971 of which Hull F.C. won 28 matches and lost 17.

With the coaching appointment of Arthur Bunting in 1978, Hull F.C. began a period of dominance. Hull F.C. won all of their 26 Division Two matches in 1978–79, the only time a club has won all of its league matches in a season and returning to the top flight. The Airlie Birds lost the 1980 Challenge Cup final against Hull Kingston Rovers 10–5 and never won at Wembley until 2016. It was reputed that a makeshift sign was left on the A63 (the major westerly road out of Hull) that read "last one out turn the lights off!" due to most of the city travelling to Wembley for the final. In 1982, Hull F.C., crushed by Widnes in the Premiership Final, avenged the defeat with an 18–9 Challenge Cup replay win at Elland Road.

Hull F.C. eventually won the league in 1983 and also reached the Premiership final, the Challenge Cup final and the Yorkshire County Cup Final, but the latter trophy would be their only reward from the three finals. They lost to Featherstone Rovers at Wembley in one of the great Challenge Cup final upsets and they also lost the Premiership final three years running.

The signing of Australian Peter Sterling, a 2006 inductee into the Australian Rugby League Hall of Fame, maintained HullF.C.’s strength, and Bunting’s men went to their third successive Yorkshire Cup beating Hull KR 29–12, but were edged out in arguably the greatest ever Challenge Cup Final in 1985 by Wigan at Wembley Stadium with a score of 28 to 24 in Wigan's favour. The game was played in front 99,801 fans, the rugby league attendance record for Wembley. A number of subsequent coaches, such as Brian Smith (1988–90) failed to deliver consistent success. Hull F.C. lost the Premiership final in 1989 to Widnes, but two years later returned to beat them 14–4 at Old Trafford under coach Noel Cleal.

Royce Simmons moved to England to coach Hull F.C. for two seasons from 1992 to 1994. In June 1993, financial trouble forced Hull F.C. to put seven players on the transfer list and Royce Simmons ran five marathons to raise money to pay for players from Australia.

Summer era 

In 1996, the first tier of British rugby league clubs played the inaugural Super League season and changed from a winter to a summer season. As the sport in Britain entered a new era, controversy was sparked in the city of Hull when it was suggested that Hull F.C. should merge with Hull Kingston Rovers to form 'Humberside'. Hull F.C.'s shareholders gave the idea general approval but it was ultimately resisted. The club like many other rugby league clubs re-branded and became known as the Hull Sharks. It is unclear who came up with the 'Sharks' as a nickname but for a nautical city it was a fairly obvious choice. Hull Sharks finished below the cut-off point of 10th in the existing top flight and so were excluded from the new Super League.

Phil Sigsworth joined the club in 1996 and coached them to the First Division championship title and promotion to Super League in 1997 But struggled to compete in the top division. Off field issues with the board ended up with 2 companies becoming one and Hull Sharks reverted to Hull FC. With ex-St. Helens coach Shaun McRae who remained at the helm until 2004.

After 107 years at the Boulevard, Hull F.C. moved in January 2003 to a £44 million state-of-the-art council-owned Kingston Communications Stadium, more commonly known as the KC Stadium and the rejuvenation of the club continued. Although they are joint tenants at the stadium alongside the city's football club Championship side Hull City : the two teams sharing use of the stadium, Hull F.C. have been forced to play a cup match away at Doncaster to avoid two matches clashing. Shaun McRae left the club to return to Australia at the end of the 2004 season; he was replaced by former England coach John Kear, who had previously been McRae's deputy.

In his first season at the club, Kear led Hull F.C. to the Rugby League Challenge Cup Final for the first time since 1985. Hull F.C. defeated Leeds 25–24 in a thrilling final at Cardiff's Millennium Stadium to lift the trophy. Paul Cooke's 77th minute try, which was converted by Danny Brough gave Hull a 1-point lead, which they held onto after Hull F.C. captain Richard Swain charged down a drop-goal attempt from Leeds skipper Kevin Sinfield in the dying seconds of the match.

John Kear left Hull F.C. on 3 April 2006 after a disappointing start to the season, which saw Hull F.C. lose four out of their first seven league games and also their defence of the Challenge Cup being ended at the first hurdle against the Bradford Bulls in a 23–12 defeat, to be replaced by Australian Peter Sharp who was recruited from Parramatta Eels where he was assistant coach. Between 14 April – 15 July 2006 Hull F.C. won 13 matches in succession, including a 27–26 defeat of the league leaders St Helens on 8 June 2006. The last time they beat St Helens on their ground was 18 years ago. This run ended in defeat at Harlequins RL on 23 July 2006. Hull F.C. managed to finish in second place, their highest league position in the Super League era. They lost to the league leaders St. Helens in the first Grand Final playoff game, but succeeded in reaching the final by defeating the reigning champions Bradford. Over 20,000 Hull F.C. fans travelled to Old Trafford, but again they lost out to the Saints, this time by 26–4. The overall attendance broke the Grand Final record, mainly due to the stadium's recent expansion.

For the 2007 season, Hull F.C. signed five players: Matt Sing (a prolific National Rugby League try-scorer and Australian representative), Hutch Maiava, Willie Manu, Danny Tickle and Wayne Godwin. Also, the  Hull Football Club v Hull Kingston Rovers derbies are back for the 2007 season due to Rovers' promotion from National League 1. The first of four of these derby matches was played on Easter Monday, 9 April 2007, at the KC Stadium. The game was played in front of a sell-out attendance of 23,002 and ended with a result for the Black and Whites who had been struggling early in the season. The final score was 22–14 with Sid Domic crossing the line for the Airlie Birds in the final seconds.

On 23 April Paul Cooke, stand-off, controversially resigned from Hull Football Club to join Hull Kingston Rovers. Cooke claimed he was out of contract as he had not signed the contract that the club had offered him. Following his departure, club chief executive David Plummer resigned. His replacement James Rule has come in for much criticism.

Hull F.C. have endured a poor 2008 season and on 19 May 2008 the club dismissed coach Peter Sharp. A week later they appointed his assistant Richard Agar as his replacement. John Sharp has since been named as an addition to the Hull F.C. coaching staff. Hull F.C. finished a poor 11th in the League in 2008, falling far short of the fans expectations, although a Challenge cup final appearance and a successful franchise application ensured the season was not a complete failure. The club announced that Australian test forward Michael Crocker will sign for the club on a three-year contract from the start of the 2008–09 season. Fullback Chris Thorman has signed a one-year deal for 2009, after leaving Huddersfield. Matty Dale, Matt Sing and James Webster were released at the end of the season. Former HKR favourite – Webster having only played one game.

In March 2009 Michael Crocker was denied a visa to come to England to play for Hull F.C.. Hull F.C. announced four big name signings for the 2010 SL season: Craig Fitzgibbon, Mark O'Meley, Sean Long, and Jordan Tansey (although Tansey arrived at the club towards the end of the 2009 season, having been released early from his contract at Sydney Roosters). Several long serving players left the club at the end of the forgettable 2009 season, including Paul King, Graeme Horne, and Gareth Raynor.

Super League XV started well with five wins from the first seven games, the two losses coming away against Crusaders and Wigan Warriors. F.C. beat Hull K.R. 18–14 in the first derby of the year at Craven Park, but then followed a period of one win from five games, in which the team were convincingly knocked out of the Challenge Cup by Leeds. Hull F.C. finished the regular season in 6th place, however a convincing 21–4 home defeat by rivals Hull Kingston Rovers brought an early end to their playoff campaign.

On 22 July 2011 it was confirmed that Hull City's Head of Football Operations, Adam Pearson had purchased the entire shareholding of the club together with his close friend Mikey Drake and they had taken over full control from Kath Hetherington. In a statement on the club's website, it was also confirmed that James Rule would continue as chief executive.

Richard Agar left the club at the end of the 2011 season and was replaced by Australian Peter Gentle. The 2012 season was a largely transitional one, with high player turnover and many injuries hampering the side's progress mid-season, however the club finished a respectable 6th in the regular season. They went on to convincingly beat Huddersfield in the first round of play-off games but fell to defeat away at Warrington in the preliminary semi-finals.

For the 2013 season, Hull F.C. again finished 6th in the regular season and beat Catalans at home in the first round of the play-offs but were comprehensively beaten 76–18 by Huddersfield in the second round. Hull F.C. also reached the Challenge cup final for the first time in 5 years but were beaten 16–0 by Wigan. On 24 September 2013 Hull F.C. announced the departure of Peter Gentle with two years still remaining on his contract. It is thought the record loss to Huddersfield in the play-offs along with the poor performance at Wembley were the main factors behind his demise. The next day Hull F.C. announced that 34-year-old assistant Lee Radford will become Head Coach from 2014 and Andy Last would step up to become Lee's assistant. Also former player Motu Tony becomes the new director of football, replacing outgoing director Shaun McRae.

In 2016 a promising beginning to the season was crushed with a 46–6 loss to Widnes. After this coach Lee Radford was locked out of the changing room. After this Hull endured a 10-game winning streak and finished on top of the Super League Table. Hull FC finally won at Wembley in 2016 with a win over Warrington in the Challenge Cup. (Which they followed up the next season to defeat Wigan to retain the trophy) After this Victory Hull ended their season by Finishing 3rd in the Super 8's, Hull later lost to Wigan in the Semi-Finals of the Play Offs.

In March 2020, Hull FC announced the departure of Lee Radford after a 38–4 home loss to Warrington Wolves. It transpired to be Hull FC's final fixture before the nation was put into lockdown due to the coronavirus pandemic. Assistant coach Andy Last was put in interim charge of the club until the end of the 2020 season, guiding the team to the play-off semi-finals, where they were eventually upended by Wigan Warriors. Last departed the club at the end of the 2020 season to take up an assistant coach role at fellow Super League club Wakefield Trinity.

In November 2020, Hull FC announced that Brett Hodgson would take over as head coach of the club for the 2021 season. The Australian coach won his first game of the season against the club he once played for, Huddersfield Giants. 

Hull FC played their first match in front of spectators following the Covid-19 lockdown on 17 May 2021. They were defeated 27–10 by Catalans Dragons at home.
Hull F.C. started the 2021 Super League season in strong fashion, only losing once in their opening seven games.  However, the club ended the season winning only once in their last nine matches.  This saw Hull F.C. finish the year in 8th place on the table.
Hull F.C. finished the 2022 Super League season in 9th place on the table.  Head coach Brett Hodgson resigned from his post and was replaced by Tony Smith for the 2023 season.

Stadiums

1895–2002: The Boulevard 
Hull F.C. moved into The Boulevard shortly after the formation of the Northern Rugby Football Union. Between 1904 and 1905 the ground was shared with Hull City A.F.C. and speedway also took place during the 1940s, 1970s, and 1980s, and also had a greyhound track in 2007. The Boulevard also hosted many international rugby league games. Like a number of grounds at the time, the pitch at The Boulevard was surrounded by a Motorcycle speedway track that was also later used for Greyhound racing.

2003 – present: MKM Stadium 
In 2003 Hull F.C. moved into the KC Stadium, renamed KCOM Stadium in 2016 and MKM Stadium in 2021, which they share with Hull City for a second time in their history. The record attendance for a rugby league ground was 23,004 in 2007 when they played local rivals Hull Kingston Rovers.

Kit sponsors and manufacturers

Rivalries

The club's main rivalry is with cross-city side Hull KR in which they contest the Hull Derby.

2023 squad

2023 transfers

Gains

Losses

Players

Hall of Fame inductees

The following players have been inducted into Hull F.C.'s Hall of Fame:

Bill Drake · Chris Davidson · Gary Kemble · Richard Horne · Greg Mackay · Ivor Watts · James Leuluai · Jim Drake · Keith Boxall · Mick Crane · Paul Prendiville · Richard Swain · Tevita Vaikona · Trevor Skerrett · Billy Batten · Jim Kennedy · Joe Oliver · Clive Sullivan · Peter Sterling · Garry Schofield · Mick Scott · Arthur Keegan · Tommy Harris · Paul Eastwood · Phil Bell

Captains 
Also see :Category:Hull F.C. captains.

1895 to 1896 – Cyril Lempriere
1896 to 1897 – Charlie Townend
1897 to 1898 – Cyril Lempriere
1898 to 1900 – Herbert Wiles
1900 to 1901 – Jack Townend
1901 to 1902 – Tom Stitt
1902 to 1904 – Harry Taylor
1904 to 1905 – Jack Ritson
1905 to 1906 – James Harrison
1906 to 1907 – A. E. Freer
1907 to 1909 – Harry Taylor
1909 to 1910 – Billie Anderson/Billy Anderson
1910 to 1912 – George Connell
1912 to 1913 – Ed Rogers,Billie Anderson/Billy Anderson,Herb Gilbert
1913 to 1915 – Herb Gilbert
1915 to 1919 – Billy Batten
1919 to 1921 – Jim Kennedy
1921 to 1922 – Jim Kennedy, Billy Stone
1922 to 1923 – Billy Stone
1923 to 1924 – Edgar Morgan
1924 to 1925 – Jim Kennedy
1925 to 1928 – Eddie Caswell
1928 to 1930 – Harold Bowman
1930 to 1931 – Joe Oliver
1931 to 1933 – George Bateman
1933 to 1936 – Joe Oliver
1936 to 1939 – Harold Ellerington
1939 to 1945 – No fixed captain
1945 to 1946 – Charlie Booth
1946 to 1947 – Freddie Miller
1947 to 1948 – Ernie Lawrence
1948 to 1949 – George Watt
1949 to 1950 – Ernie Lawrence
1950 to 1955 – Roy Francis
1955 to 1957 – Mick Scott
1957 to 1965 – Johnny Whiteley(Bill Drake deputy 1962…63)
1965 to 1971 – Arthur Keegan
1971 to 1974 – Clive Sullivan
1974 to 1975 – Chris Davidson
1975 to 1978 – Brian Hancock
1978 to 1980 – Vince Farrar
1980 to 1981 – Steve Norton, Charlie Stone
1981 to 1985 – David Topliss
1985 to 1987 – Lee Crooks 
1987 to 1990 – Dane O'Hara
1990 to 1992 – Greg Mackey
1992 to 1994 – Russ Walker
1994 to 1996 – Steve McNamara
1996 – Gary Divorty
1997 – Andy Fisher
1998 – Alan Hunte, Gary Lester
1999 – Karl Harrison
2000 to 2001 – Tony Grimaldi
2002 to 2004 – Jason Smith
2005 to 2006 – Richard Swain
2007 to 2009 – Lee Radford
2010 – Sean Long
2011 – Craig Fitzgibbon
2012 – Andy Lynch
2013 to 2017 – Gareth Ellis
2018 to present – Danny Houghton

Past coaches 
Also see :Category:Hull F.C. coaches.

 J Gray 1895–1900
 W Wright, C Hunter 1900-3
 H Coates 1903 to 1908
 J Lewis 1908–12
 Harry Taylor
 Sid Melville 1912–27
 Edgar Wrigley 1927–31
 Edward Caswell 1931–46
 Ted Tattersfield 1946–9
 Roy Francis 1949–63
 John Whiteley 1963–70
 Ivor Watts 1970–71
 David Doyle-Davidson 1972–73
 Clive Sullivan 1973–74
 David Doyle-Davidson 1974–77
 Arthur Bunting 1978–85
 Len Casey 1986–88
 Tony Dean & Keith Hepworth 1988
 Brian Smith 1988–90
 Noel Cleal 1991–92
 Royce Simmons 1992–94
 Tony Gordon 1994
 Phil Windley & Russ Walker 1994–95
 Phil Windley 1995
 Phil Sigsworth 1996–97
 Peter Walsh 1997–99
 Steve Crooks 1999
 Shaun McRae 2000–04
 John Kear 2005–06
 Peter Sharp 2006–08
 Richard Agar 2008–11
 Peter Gentle 2012–13
 Lee Radford 2014–20
 Andy Last 2020
 Brett Hodgson 2021–22

Seasons

Super League era

Honours 
Major titles

'''Other titles

Records

Player records 

Most tries in a match: 7 by Clive Sullivan vs Doncaster, 15 April 1968
Most goals in a match: 14 by Jim Kennedy vs Rochdale Hornets- 7 April 1921, Geoffrey "Geoff" 'Sammy' Lloyd v Oldham – 10 September 1978, Matt Crowther v Sheffield Eagles – 2 March 2003
Most points in a match: 36 by Jim Kennedy vs Keighley, 29 January 1921
Most tries in a season: 52 by John "Jack" Harrison VC, MC, 1914–15
Most goals in a season: 170 by Geoffrey "Geoff" 'Sammy' Lloyd, 1978–79
Most points in a season: 369 by Geoffrey "Geoff" 'Sammy' Lloyd, 1978–79
Consecutive Tries:  11 by John "Jack" Harrison VC, MC, 1914–15 & Richard Horne, 2006

Career records 
 Most goals: 687 – Joe Oliver 1928–37 & 1943–45
 Most tries: 250 – Clive Sullivan 1961–74 & 1981–85
 Most points: 1,842 – Joe Oliver 1928–37 & 1943–45
 Most appearances: 501 – Edward Rogers 1906–25

Team records 
Highest score: 88–0 vs Sheffield Eagles, 2 March 2003
Highest against: 80–10 vs Warrington Wolves, 30 August 2018
Highest losing margin: 71 points (71–0) vs Bradford Bulls, 1 October 2005
Highest attendance (The Boulevard): 28,798 vs Leeds, 7 March 1936
Highest attendance (KC Stadium): 23,004 vs Hull KR, 2 September 2007
Highest attendance (Challenge Cup): 99,801 vs Wigan, 4 May 1985 (1985 Challenge Cup Final)
Highest attendance vs an international touring team: 16,616 vs Australia, 23 September 1948 (1948–49 Kangaroo Tour)
Only team to have won every single league game in a season: 1979 Division Two
Most consecutive Super League victories: 13 games, (14 April 2006 – 15 July 2006, beating Huddersfield, Wakefield, Catalans, Wigan, Bradford, Leeds, Huddersfield, St Helens, Harlequins, Castleford, Catalans, Salford & Warrington).
Most consecutive Super League Losses: 13 Games, (5 May 2018 – 7 February 2019, Losing to Huddersfield, St Helens, Wakefield, Hull KR, Wakefield, Huddersfield, Warrington, Castleford, St Helens, Catalans, Wigan, Hull KR & Castleford)

Also made their first super league grand final but lost to St Helens in 2006

Notes

References

External links

 

 
Rugby clubs established in 1865
Super League teams
Sport in Kingston upon Hull
1865 establishments in England
Founder members of the Northern Rugby Football Union
English rugby league teams